Jackson Peter Merrill  (born April 19, 2003) is an American professional baseball shortstop in the San Diego Padres organization. He was selected in the first round of the 2021 Major League Baseball draft by the Padres.

Early life and amateur career
Merrill grew up in Severna Park, Maryland and attended Severna Park High School. He initially committed to play college baseball for the Army Black Knights during his junior year. Merrill's junior season was canceled due to COVID-19, after which he focused on physical training and gained over 30 pounds of muscle. He later changed his commitment to the Kentucky Wildcats in the fall of his senior year. As a senior, he batted .500 with 13 home runs and 39 RBIs and was named the Maryland Player of the Year by the Capital Gazette.

Professional career
Merrill was selected 27th overall in the 2021 Major League Baseball draft by the San Diego Padres. He signed with San Diego for a $1.8 million signing bonus. 

Merrill was assigned to the Rookie-level Arizona Complex League Padres to start his professional career. Over 31 games and 107 at-bats, Merrill slashed .280/.339/.383 with seven doubles, two triples, ten RBIs, ten walks, and 27 strikeouts. He opened the 2022 season with the Lake Elsinore Storm of the Single-A California League.

References

External links

2003 births
Living people
Baseball players from Baltimore
Baseball shortstops
Arizona Complex League Padres players
Lake Elsinore Storm players
People from Severna Park, Maryland
Peoria Javelinas players